BTS Map of the Soul Tour was a planned worldwide concert tour headlined by South Korean band BTS to promote their Map of the Soul series, including their Map of the Soul: Persona EP, and Map of the Soul: 7 studio album. The all-stadium tour was announced on January 22, 2020 and was set to begin on April 11, 2020 at the Seoul Olympic Stadium in Seoul, South Korea until it was postponed due to the COVID-19 pandemic. A two-day online concert, titled BTS Map of the Soul ON:E, was held on October 10–11, 2020 in replacement of the postponed world tour. In total, the concert had an attendance of  993,000 viewers from 191 countries and territories. The postponed world tour was cancelled on August 19, 2021 due to uncertain circumstances and concerns over COVID-19.

Background
On January 21, 2020, the group first announced 38 tour dates spanning across Asia, North America, and Europe. The tour features extended North American and European visits as compared to previous tours due to popular demand. On February 27, 2020, the group cancelled all four shows in South Korea amid the ongoing COVID-19 pandemic. On March 26, 2020, the group postponed all 18 shows in North America as the COVID-19 pandemic continued to raise health concerns. On April 28, 2020, BTS announced that the entire tour would be postponed due to the COVID-19 pandemic. On August 19, 2021, the group's label Big Hit Music announced through Weverse that the entire world tour was cancelled due to uncertain circumstances.

Tour dates

Cancelled shows

Map of the Soul ON:E 

BTS Map of the Soul ON:E was a 2-day virtual pay-per-view concert headlined by South Korean band BTS to promote their Map of the Soul series, including their Map of the Soul: Persona EP, and Map of the Soul: 7 studio album in replacement of the postponed world tour. The concert was broadcast live from the KSPO Dome in Seoul on October 10–11, 2020. It was initially intended to have both a limited number of in-person tickets with a simultaneous online livestream but Big Hit Entertainment later cancelled the offline portion of the concert due to tightened COVID-19 pandemic government restrictions. The concert had different set lists each day and the production costs were an estimated 8 times higher than for their previous online show, BangBangCon: The Live. In total, the concert was attended by 993,000 viewers from 191 countries and territories.

Synopsis 
The two-and-a-half-hour show began with "On" and focused on songs from the group's most recent album, "Map of the Soul: 7," such as "N.O" and "Black Swan." For the hip-hop hit "UGH!", rappers Suga, RM, and J-Hope formed a group, while Jin, Jungkook, V, and Jimin sang the soft-pop ballad "Zero O' Clock." Jimin's debut of his dance performance for "Filter" was the show's high point. For their solo performances, RM, Suga, Jungkook, Jin, V, and J-Hope all chose different songs from the same song list: "Persona," "Shadow," “Inner Child,” "My Time," "Moon," and "Ego." The visual effects of AR and XR extend beyond simply enhancing the scenery. Dark screens resembling underwater scenery filled up the sides of the stage as the septet sang "Black Swan," while with "Dope," the large screen behind the stage made it appear as though the members were dancing on an elevator as it shot upward as RM was smashing his "Persona" stage and a huge figure exactly like him suddenly appeared in front of the stage as planets and asteroids hovered above Jin as he sang to "Moon." The band's biggest hits, "Dionysus," "DNA," "Boy With Luv," and "No More Dream," were all included in the 23-song set list for the evening, as were the three songs from Saturday's encore stage: "Butterfly," "Run," and "Dynamite." "Spring Day" and "Idol," as well as the group's most recent hit, were performed on the second day.

Set list 
{{hidden
| headercss = background: #ccccff; font-size: 100%; width: 75%;
| contentcss = text-align: left; font-size: 100%; width: 75%;
| header = Day 1 Set list (October 10, 2020)
| content = 

 "On"
 "N.O"
 "We Are Bulletproof Pt.2"
 "Intro: Persona"
 "Boy in Luv"
 "Dionysus"
 "Interlude: Shadow"
 "Black Swan
 "Ugh!"
 "00:00"
 "My Time"
 "Filter"
 "Moon"
 "Inner Child"
 "Outro: Ego"
 "Boy with Luv"
 "DNA"
 "Dope"
 "No More Dream"
Encore
 "Butterfly"
 "Run"
 "Dynamite"
 "We Are Bulletproof: The Eternal"
}}

{{hidden
| headercss = background: #ccccff; font-size: 100%; width: 75%;
| contentcss = text-align: left; font-size: 100%; width: 75%;
| header = Day 2 Set list (October 11, 2020)
| content = 

 On
 N.O
 We Are Bulletproof Pt.2
 Intro: Persona
 Boy in Luv
 Dionysus
 Interlude: Shadow
 Black Swan
 UGH!
 00:00
 My Time
 Filter
 Moon
 Inner Child
 Outro: Ego
 Boy with Luv
 DNA
 Dope
 No More Dream
Encore
 Spring Day
 Idol
 Dynamite
 We Are Bulletproof: The Eternal
}}

References 

BTS concert tours
2020 concert tours
Concert tours cancelled due to the COVID-19 pandemic